Donald Theodore Vosberg (October 3, 1919 – June 21, 1997) was an American football player in the National Football League (NFL). He was drafted in the seventh round of the 1941 NFL Draft by the New York Giants and played that season with the team.

See also
 List of NCAA major college football yearly receiving leaders

References

1919 births
1997 deaths
American football ends
Marquette Golden Avalanche football players
New York Giants players
Sportspeople from Dubuque, Iowa
Players of American football from Iowa